The 2014 South American Junior Rugby Championship (Sudamérica Rugby (CONSUR) Championship) Division A was the first edition of the newly formatted South American Junior Rugby Championship for Under 19 national teams. It was held in Montevideo from September 14 to September 20. The top 4 nations of South America play the tournament.

Uruguay was the champion had to play for the Junior CONSUR Cup against Argentina.

The tournament served as CONSUR's qualifier for the 2015 World Rugby Under 20 Trophy to be held in Portugal.

Standings

Matches

First round

Second round

Third round

Junior CONSUR Cup
It was the first edition between the 2014 champions Uruguay against the 2013 champions Argentina. The Pumitas won 67-3.

See also
 South American Junior Rugby Championship

References

External links
Sudamérica Rugby Official Webpage 

2014 rugby union tournaments for national teams
Junior
International rugby union competitions hosted by Uruguay
rugby union
rugby union
rugby union
rugby union